The 1930 New Hampshire gubernatorial election was held on November 4, 1930. Republican nominee John Gilbert Winant defeated Democratic nominee Albert W. Noone with 57.98% of the vote.

General election

Candidates
Major party candidates
John Gilbert Winant, Republican
Albert W. Noone, Democratic

Other candidates
Fred B. Chase, Socialist

Results

References

1930
New Hampshire
Gubernatorial